The 2021 Antrim Senior Hurling Championship was the 121st staging of the Antrim Senior Hurling Championship since its establishment by the Antrim County Board in 1901. The championship began on 24 August 2021 and ended on 10 October 2021.

Cúchulains Dunloy entered the championship as the defending champions.

The final was played on 10 October 2021 at Corrigan Park in Belfast, between Cúchulains Dunloy and O'Donovan Rossa, in what was their first meeting in a final in 24 years. Cúchulains Dunloy won the match by 3-23 to 1-14 to claim their 15th championship title overall and a third successive title.

Team changes

To Championship

Promoted from the Antrim Intermediate Hurling Championship
 Tír na nÓg, Randalstown

Fixtures/results

Group 1

Group 1 table

Group 2

Group 2 table

Knockout stage

Quarter-finals

Semi-finals

Final

References

Antrim Senior Hurling Championship
Antrim Senior Hurling Championship
Antrim Senior Hurling Championship